Silt is a Statutory Town in Garfield County, Colorado, United States. The population was 3,536 at the 2020 census, up from 2,930 at the 2010 census. A post office called "Silt" has been in operation since 1898. The community was named for the silt deposits at the original town site.

Geography
Interstate 70 passes through the town as it follows the river, with access from Exit 97. U.S. Route 6 is Main Street in Silt, and provides a local route parallel to I-70.

Climate
This climatic region is typified by large seasonal temperature differences, with warm to hot (and often humid) summers and cold (sometimes severely cold) winters. According to the Köppen Climate Classification system, Silt has a humid continental climate, abbreviated "Dfb" on climate maps.

Demographics

As of the census of 2000, there were 1,740 people, 648 households, and 452 families residing in the town. The racial makeup of the town was 89.60% White, 0.17% African American, 1.32% Native American, 7.41% from other races, and 1.49% from two or more races. Hispanic or Latino of any race were 14.20% of the population.

There were 648 households, out of which 41.0% had children under the age of 18 living with them, 58.3% were married couples living together, 7.1% had a female householder with no husband present, and 30.2% were non-families. 23.9% of all households were made up of individuals, and 5.9% had someone living alone who was 65 years of age or older. The average household size was 2.69 and the average family size was 3.21.

In the town, the population was spread out, with 30.5% under the age of 18, 7.8% from 18 to 24, 37.6% from 25 to 44, 18.2% from 45 to 64, and 5.9% who were 65 years of age or older. The median age was 31 years. For every 100 females, there were 108.9 males. For every 100 females age 18 and over, there were 104.4 males.

The median income for a household in the town was $44,632, and the median income for a family was $51,736. Males had a median income of $37,566 versus $25,417 for females. The per capita income for the town was $17,723. About 5.0% of families and 7.8% of the population were below the poverty line, including 5.1% of those under age 18 and 17.1% of those age 65 or over.

Education
Silt is within Garfield Re-2 School District. The town is home to Cactus Valley Elementary School. Riverside Middle School and Coal Ridge High School, located in neighboring New Castle, serve the students of Silt.

See also

Colorado
Outline of Colorado
Index of Colorado-related articles
Bibliography of Colorado
Geography of Colorado
History of Colorado
Colorado statistical areas
Glenwood Springs, CO Micropolitan Statistical Area
List of counties in Colorado
Garfield County, Colorado
List of places in Colorado
List of census-designated places in Colorado
List of forts in Colorado
List of ghost towns in Colorado
List of mountain passes in Colorado
List of mountain peaks of Colorado
List of municipalities in Colorado
List of post offices in Colorado
Protected areas of Colorado

References

External links

CDOT map of Silt

Towns in Garfield County, Colorado
Towns in Colorado
Populated places established in 1915
1915 establishments in Colorado